Ommastrephinae is a subfamily of squids under the family Ommastrephidae.

Description

Ommastrephinae are mostly pelagic members of the family Ommastrephidae. Some species of the subfamily (notably Sthenoteuthis and Ommastrephes) are known for their behavior of leaping out of the water (hence the common names 'flying squid').

Taxonomy

The name of the subfamily, like the family itself and one if its member genera, Ommastrephes, comes from Greek ὄμμα ('eye') and -strephes ('rolling'). They were first described by H.J. Posselt in 1891.

List of genera
Eight species of squids are recognized under Ommastrephinae, divided among six genera. They are the following:

Genus Dosidicus
Dosidicus gigas, Humboldt squid, jumbo flying squid or jumbo squid
Genus Eucleoteuthis
Eucleoteuthis luminosa, striped squid or luminous flying squid
Genus Hyaloteuthis
Hyaloteuthis pelagica, glass squid or glassy flying squid
Genus Ommastrephes
Ommastrephes bartramii, neon flying squid or red flying squid
Genus Ornithoteuthis
Ornithoteuthis antillarum, Atlantic bird squid
Ornithoteuthis volatilis, shiny bird squid
Genus Sthenoteuthis
Sthenoteuthis oualaniensis, purpleback squid or purpleback flying squid
Sthenoteuthis pteropus, orangeback squid or orangeback flying squid

References

External links
Ommastrephinae at the Tree of Life web project.

Squid
Gliding animals
Protostome subfamilies